The Brewster Subdivision is a railroad line owned by CSX Transportation in Florida. The line runs from the Valrico Subdivision at Edison Junction south through Bradley Junction to Arcadia for a total of 47.2 miles.  It junctions with the Achan Subdivision and the Agricola Spur at Bradley Junction, and connects to the Seminole Gulf Railway in Arcadia.

Operation

The Brewster Subdivision begins at Edison Junction near the community of Keysville.  It starts as a wye that branches off the Valrico Subdivision.  From here, it proceeds southeast to Bradley Junction, where it turns south on to the former Charlotte Harbor and Northern Railway.  From Bradley Junction, the line continues south to Agrock, Fort Green Springs, and Ona before coming to a point just north of Arcadia where it connects with the Seminole Gulf Railway, a shortline that operates the continuing track south to Punta Gorda and Fort Myers.

The Brewster Subdivision is CSX's second busiest line through the Bone Valley after the Valrico Subdivision.  The line is dispatched through Track warrant control.

The line serves three phosphate facilities operated by The Mosaic Company.  Mosaic's New Wales processing plant is located near the north end of the line between Edison and Bradley Junction and is considered by Mosaic to be the world's largest phosphate processing facility. 
Four Corners Mine is located a short distance behind Agrock yard south of Bradley Junction.  Agrock yard is used by Mosaic as a staging area for Four Corners Mine and operates their own locomotives and equipment from the mine to the yard.  The southernmost phosphate mine on the line is Mosaic's South Pasture Mine in Fort Green Springs which was previously operated by CF Industries before it was bought by Mosaic.  South Pasture Mine is currently not operating and has been idle since 2018.  Though Mosaic plans to reactivate it at some point in the future.  When active, South Pasture is the southernmost point of CSX's Bone Valley operations.

The only traffic on the Brewster Subdivision that runs south of South Pasture is twice-weekly mixed freight from Winston Yard to Arcadia for interchange with Seminole Gulf Railway.  This traffic is the only non-phosphate related rail traffic on the Brewster Subdivision.

History

The northern segment of the Brewster Subdivision from Edison to Bradley Junction and the Agricola spur was built by the Seaboard Air Line Railroad in 1910.  From Bradley Junction south to Arcadia, the line was an extension of the Charlotte Harbor and Northern Railway built in 1911.  The Charlotte Harbor and Northern Railway historically extended as far south as Boca Grande, which was once the location of a major phosphate shipping port.  The line was previously known as the Fort Myers Subdivision from 1926 to 1952, and the Boca Grande Subdivision from 1982 to 1981.

The Seaboard Air Line Railroad bought the Charlotte Harbor and Northern Railway in 1926.  In 1967, the Seaboard Air Line and the Atlantic Coast Line merged to form the Seaboard Coast Line Railroad.  In 1980, the Seaboard Coast Line's parent company merged with the Chessie System, creating the CSX Corporation.  The CSX Corporation initially operated the Chessie and Seaboard Systems separately until 1986, when they were merged into CSX Transportation.

The line once had a spur track to the former Payne Creek Mine east of Agrock Yard.  Payne Creek Mine has since been redeveloped by Mosaic into the Streamsong Resort and golf course.

Track south of Arcadia to Boca Grande was abandoned in 1981 after the closure of Port Boca Grande.  The remaining line was subsequently renamed the Brewster Subdivision, which is named for the defunct ghost town of Brewster that was located just south of Bradley Junction.  The town existed from 1910 to 1962 and played a role in the area's phosphate industry.  Remnants of the town include a smokestack and a few abandoned buildings.

Gallery

References

CSX Transportation lines
1910 establishments in Florida
Rail infrastructure in Florida
Transportation in Polk County, Florida
Transportation in DeSoto County, Florida